Helen Tran is a professor of chemistry at the University of Toronto. She was named by Chemical & Engineering News as one of their "Talented 12" in 2022. A statue of Tran was exhibited for the IfThenSheCan exhibit in the NorthPark Center in Dallas in 2021 and in Washington, D.C. in March 2022.

Early life and education 
Tran grew up in the United States. She was interested in art when she was at middle school, but shifted her focus to chemistry during her undergraduate studies at the University of California, Berkeley. Tran then worked at the Lawrence Berkeley National Laboratory with polymer chemist Ron Zuckerman. Tran was a graduate student at Columbia University, where she worked alongside Luis Campos on hierarchical ordering in block co-polymer systems. After earning her doctorate, she moved to Stanford University, where she worked under the supervision of Zhenan Bao. She was selected as an American Association for the Advancement of Science IF/THEN ambassador in 2019.

Research and career 
Tran's research considers next-generation materials that are stimuli-responsive for novel technologies. She started her independent scientific career at the University of Toronto in 2021. She has studied peptide-like polymers, 'peptoids', which undergo self-assembly to form useful nanomaterials.

Awards and honors 
 2019 American Association for the Advancement of Science IF/THEN Ambassador
 2019 Helena Anna Henzl-Gabor Award
 2021 Dorothy Shoichet Award
 2022 Chemical & Engineering News Talented 12

Selected publications

References 

American women chemists
Canadian women chemists
Academic staff of the University of Toronto
Living people
Year of birth missing (living people)
Columbia University alumni
University of California, Berkeley alumni